Krpeľany is a village and municipality in Martin District in the Žilina Region of northern Slovakia.

History
In historical records the village was first mentioned in 1430.

Geography
The municipality lies at an altitude of 410 metres and covers an area of 13.886 km². It has a population of about 1100 people.

External links
https://web.archive.org/web/20070427022352/http://www.statistics.sk/mosmis/eng/run.html

Villages and municipalities in Martin District